The Corvus Racer 312 is a Chinese ultralight and light-sport aircraft under development by Corvus Aerospace (Suzhou) of Suzhou and first flown 1 November 2013. The aircraft is to be supplied complete and ready-to-fly.

Design and development
The Racer 312 was designed as a smaller version of the Corvus Racer 540, to comply with the Fédération Aéronautique Internationale microlight rules and US light-sport aircraft rules. It was designed and the prototype built over a period of 13 months in 2012-13.

The Racer 312 features a cantilever low-wing, two-seats-in-side-by-side configuration under a bubble canopy, fixed tricycle landing gear and a single engine in tractor configuration. The aircraft is made from composite material and its  span wing employs split flaps. The standard engine fitted is the  Rotax 912ULS four-stroke powerplant. With this engine the cruise speed is anticipated to be .

As of February 2017, the design does not appear on the Federal Aviation Administration's list of approved special light-sport aircraft.

Specifications (Racer 312)

References

External links

Racer 312
2010s Chinese ultralight aircraft
Light-sport aircraft
Single-engined tractor aircraft